Satish Upadhyay (born 6 March 1962) is an Indian politician serving as the Vice Chairman of New Delhi Municipal Council (NDMC). He was former President of the Delhi Unit of the Bharatiya Janata Party (BJP) and the Councillor from the Malviya Nagar's Ward No. 161 in the South Delhi Municipal Council (SDMC). He was elected President of the Delhi BJP in July 2014 in the Lok Sabha elections. Prior to his taking presidential office, he served as Vice President of the Delhi BJP unit from 2010-2012 and as Secretary of the Delhi BJP unit from 2009-2010.

Upadhyay joined the Rashtriya Swayamsevak Sangh (RSS) and the Akhil Bharatiya Vidyarthi Parishad (ABVP) in the 1980s. He has also been a Member of  the Censor Board of Film Certification and the TAC in Delhi.

Student life
He has a Bachelor of Arts Honours degree in Political Science from Delhi University. While in college, he joined the Akhil Bharatiya Vidyarthi Parishad (ABVP) and contested Delhi University Student Union elections as an ABVP candidate. Extremely popular among the students, he was elected as the youngest Vice President of Delhi University Student Union in 1982.
He was the Secretary of the ABVP in Delhi State from 1984-1986.

Early political career
After completing his graduation, Upadhyay joined Bharatiya Janata Yuva Morcha (BJYM), the youth wing of BJP. He was made the General Secretary (organisation), BJYM of Delhi State in 1988 and continued in the same position till 1990. He rapidly rose to the top echelons of power in BJYM and was made the President BJYM of Delhi State in 2002; a position he held until 2004. He made valuable contributions in the 1993 Delhi Assembly Elections. He was also the member of Media Team at the BJP Headquarters during 1998-2000.

Electoral politics
He held various important positions in the party. An ardent party worker, his stature in the party grew over the years and after working for the people for three decades, he finally entered electoral politics in 2012 and contested the Municipal Corporation of Delhi (MCD) elections from Malviya Nagar for Ward No. 161. He won the election and was also entrusted the job of Chairman of the Education Committee of the SDMC. His work as the Chairman brought him much admiration and he was selected for a second term too. He was later selected as the Chairman of the Standing Committee.

As the Chairman of the Education Committee, Upadhyay took several measures to make the system more transparent and accountable. He brought improvements in the mid-day-meal scheme, finalised many tendering processes which included construction of municipal school buildings, appointed primary teachers, renewed the municipal children insurance scheme, and introduced a Merit Scholarship Exam.

During his tenure, proposals for the opening of four new primary schools and 12 new nursery sections in municipal schools were made, while Computer Aided Learning (CAL) laboratories in municipal schools were re-introduced. He proposed the opening of a central level sports academy and a sports institute in each zone for providing special coaching facility to municipal school students. Establishment of the Teachers' Training Institute was finalised and an action plan for converting semi-concrete school buildings into concrete school buildings was prepared.

Upadhyay initiated the "self-defence training programme for girl students and female teachers and disaster management training for school staff and children". He introduced e-toilets and CCTV cameras in the schools and renovated the Science Museum in Sector 6, R.K. Puram. He also organised educational tours for cultural exchange with the northeast states of India and appointed Special Educators for children with special needs.

After heading the education committee for two years, he was unanimously elected as the Chairman Standing Committee of the SDMC. Under his Chairmanship, SDMC was able to institutionalise changes for the betterment of the society.

In a short span of time, he has made his mark in the Indian political arena and taken the Delhi unit of BJP in a new direction. He was appointed president of BJP's Delhi state unit after the Lok Sabha elections in July 2014 and took over the reins from Dr. Harsh Vardhan.
In September 2014, he resigned as the Chairman of the Standing Committee of the SDMC to focus on party responsibilities. He is now the primary architect of the party's action plan in Delhi.

Social life
Since his school days, as a RSS volunteer, Upadhyay has been actively involved in developmental works. He was a member of various religious and social organisations and worked with dedication for the social welfare of people in health and education of underprivileged children in particular.

Personal life
He is married to Aarti Upadhyay and together they have three children.

External links

References

Living people
Bharatiya Janata Party politicians from Delhi
People from Delhi
1962 births